Čavaš is a village in the municipality of Ravno, Bosnia and Herzegovina.

Demographics 
According to the 2013 census, its population was 8, all Serbs.

References

Populated places in Ravno, Bosnia and Herzegovina
Serb communities in the Federation of Bosnia and Herzegovina